Harry Stott (born 30 September 1995), from Henley-on-Thames, Oxfordshire, is a British stage and television actor and a journalist. As a child he starred in the West End production of Mary Poppins, and later as the lead role in Andrew Lloyd Weber's Oliver!. He also had television roles, most notably as the character of Lupus in the BBC's Roman Mysteries.

Acting career 

Stott's theatre experience includes the role of Michael Banks in the West End theatre production of Mary Poppins for which he also sang in the cast recording.

In 2008, he was one of three boys selected on the TV show I'd Do Anything to share the title role in Cameron Mackintosh's 2009 West End revival of Oliver! at the Theatre Royal Drury Lane. He alternated the role with Gwion Wyn Jones and Laurence Jeffcoate. The cast featured Jodie Prenger who won her role of Nancy on I'd Do Anything, Burn Gorman as Bill Sikes and Rowan Atkinson as Fagin. He performed on the show's opening night of 14 January 2009, and is featured on the cast recording. He played the role from January until July 2009.

He played the character of Lupus in the television series Roman Mysteries, based on the novels of the same name by Caroline Lawrence. Lupus cannot speak, and interacts with his friends through sign language, writing and drawing.

Later career 

Stott is now an independent journalist, and has worked as a producer at Adrift Entertainment. He hosts a monthly radio show on London's TWR (Totally Wired Radio).

Further reading

References

External links

Harry Stott at Broadway World.com

1995 births
Living people
English male child actors
English male stage actors
English male television actors
People from Henley-on-Thames
Reality casting show winners